The Fleet Intelligence Command belonged to the self-defense fleet of the Maritime Self-Defense Forces. It was previously known as Information Business Group.

History 
It was the only intelligence unit of the Maritime Self-Defense Force, which was organized as an information business group with the establishment of the Defense Intelligence Headquarters on January 20, 1997.

On 1 October 2020, the Information Business Group was abolished and the Fleet Intelligence Command was renewed. The Operation Information Support Corps, Electronic Information Support Corps, and Basic Information Support Corps were abolished, and the Operation Information Corps and Electromagnetic Information Corps were newly added. With the new edition of the Fleet Intelligence Command, the capacity has been increased from about 200 to about 230, the efficiency of operations has been improved by integrating the units, the ability to collect and analyze electromagnetic wave information, etc. has been improved, and the information support function for the Self-Defense Fleet has been added.

The main task is to analyze and distribute operational information necessary for units such as the Self-Defense Fleet and the Regional District Forces that operate ships and aircraft.

The headquarters is located in the Maritime Operations Center in the Funakoshi district (7-73, Funakoshi-cho, Yokosuka City, Kanagawa Prefecture), and the commander of the Fleet Intelligence Command is assigned by the 1st class.

Organization

Fleet Intelligence Command (Funakoshi) 

 Intelligence Management Office

Operational Intelligence Center (Funakoshi) 

 General Affairs Department
 Strategic Intelligence Department 1
 Strategic Intelligence Department 2
 Strategic Intelligence Department 3
 Computer Science

Electromagnetic Intelligence Command (Funakoshi) 

 General Affairs Department
 Computer Science
 Electromagnetic Intelligence Department 1
 Electromagnetic Intelligence Department 2
 Research Guidance Department

Citations

External links 

 Fleet Intelligence Command
Instructions on the organization of the basic information support team
Instructions on the organization of electronic information support teams
Instructions on the organization of the operational information support team

Japan Maritime Self-Defense Force
Naval history of Japan